Zamboanga Chong Hua High School (ZCHHS), in Zamboanga City, Philippines, is a private, non-sectarian secondary school that was established in 1919.

History
In the early days of 1917, the Chinese community in Zamboanga City was growing rapidly. A small group of expatriates from mainland China founded an institution of learning known as the Chinese Nationalist School. Imbued with the desire for a formal Chinese education for their children, the group sought permission from Egbert Mylo Smoyer the American superintendent of schools. He granted the authority for the group to open the first Chinese school to offers free formal Chinese education. It operated with the full support of the Chinese National Party members but later was converted into a non-partisan community school.

The school was originally created to make sure all children of Chinese residents learn Mandarin. It later directed its teachings in the enlightenment of the students to the principles of Dr. Sun Yat Sen, whose birth anniversary falls on November 12: the school's foundation day. With its conversion into a community school, it gained the support of Chinese nationals whose financial and moral support paved the way for the school's growth.

Zamboanga Chong Hua High School was originally along Magay when the institution had few students. As the student population grew, it was relocated to two other locations in the city proper before settling to its present site on Marahui (now Gen. Vicente Alvarez Street).

90th anniversary celebration

On November 12, 2009, the Zamboanga Chong Hua High School celebrated its 90th anniversary. A Lauriat Night was held on November 13 and the Grand Alumni Homecoming on November 15.

100th anniversary celebration
In 2019, the Zamboanga Chong Hua High School celebrated its centenary. The events started on November 7, 2019 with a Thanksgiving Mass at St. Joseph Church. On November 8, 2019, the Lauriat Night was held with a Great Gatsby-themed Lantern Parade followed by the Grand Alumni Fellowship Night last November 9 at the Grand Astoria Regency in Pasonanca. And finally, on November 10, the ZCHHS Centennial Night was held at the Grand Astoria Regency in Pasonanca.

References

External links
Zamboanga Chong Hua High School official websites

Chinese-language schools in the Philippines
Schools in Zamboanga City
High schools in the Philippines